The British Rail Class 98 is a Total Operations Processing System (TOPS) classification that has been used to cover all steam locomotives used on the mainline in Britain, but also has a particular usage for the three Vale of Rheidol Railway-design  locomotives that remained in the ownership of British Rail (BR) after the end of mainline steam traction in August 1968. The locomotives on the Vale of Rheidol Railway were the only steam locomotives ever officially to carry the British Rail corporate blue and the double arrow logo.

The number 98010 was assigned to an  locomotive acquired by BR in 1987. This locomotive also worked the Vale of Rheidol and was sold along with the steam locomotives. 98010 was built by the Brecon Mountain Railway, using parts supplied by Baguley-Drewry.

Vale of Rheidol locomotives
These three steam locomotives, numbered 7-9 by the Great Western Railway and British Railways, were the only ones to survive in BR's ownership after the end of mainline steam traction in August 1968. Under TOPS they were allocated Class 98 and were nominally numbered 98007-98009, but these numbers were never actually carried on the locomotives.

Registered steam locomotives

The Class 98 series has also been used for privately owned steam locomotives registered to run on the mainline since 1971. The first two digits are the class designation, in this case 98, the remaining three digits are allocated as follows:

The third digit represents the power classification, which was assigned (with a few exceptions) to all British Railways locomotives. The narrow gauge VoRR locomotives were not assigned a power class, but for TOPS purposes were allocated to power class 0. Three standard gauge locomotives have run on the mainline that were not previously in BR stock; Lady Armaghdale (Hunslet works No. 686 of 1898) was assigned power class 1F on the basis of its tractive effort, Barbara, a Hunslet Austerity 0-6-0ST (works No. 2890 of 1943/rebuilt 1962 as 3882), assigned power class 4F on the basis of the classification given to LNER Class J94 of the same design, and the new-build A1 Pacific locomotive Tornado assigned power class 8P on the basis of the power class assigned to the LNER Peppercorn Class A1 on which it was based.  Additionally, two engines in LMS stock but not BR stock were given their LMS power classification 1P.

The fourth and fifth digits usually represent the locomotive's BR number, with a few exceptions. Some ex-LNER locomotives have numbers based on their LNER pre-1946 numbers, these being Class A3 Flying Scotsman (4472), Class A4s Mallard (4468) and Sir Nigel Gresley (4498), LNER Class J36 Maude (NBR 673, LNER pre-1946 9673) and Class V2 Green Arrow (4771).  Furthermore, the aforementioned locomotives not of BR origin obviously cannot have numbers based on non-existent BR numbers, so Lady Armaghdale number is based on the works number 686, Barbara on the works number of its 1962 rebuild, and Tornado is assigned the number it carries, 60163, being one greater than the last of the previous Peppercorn A1s.

In a few cases, this process results in the duplication of an existing number, so another is assigned.  SR Class U 31625 is TOPS 98426 as it would otherwise duplicate GWR 7325 (TOPS 98425), BR Standard Class 8 71000 Duke of Gloucester (TOPS No. 98802) as it would otherwise duplicate GWR King Class 6000 King George V (TOPS No. 98800).

List of locomotives assigned TOPS numbers

The following is a list of locomotives assigned TOPS numbers. In the power class column, * denotes that this locomotive was not ex-BR and therefore was not assigned a power class by BR. In some cases the names indicated have only been applied during the preservation period.

The given power classes are based on the ones used in the locomotive's TOPS number. BR changed the rating of a few classes e.g. LNER V2 were classified as 6MT, but this was later changed to 7P6F.

An up-to-date list of active mainline locomotives is maintained here.

References

External links

British Rail locomotives
Vale of Rheidol Railway
Steam locomotives of Great Britain
Standard gauge locomotives of Great Britain
Narrow gauge locomotives of the United Kingdom